Bajgiran (also Romanized as Bājgīrān) is the capital of Bajgiran District, in Quchan County, Razavi Khorasan Province, Iran. At the 2006 census, its population was 753, in 217 families. Located on the Iran-Turkmenistan border, it is the site of an official crossing point to Turkmenistan.

History 
Most of its inhabitants are Kormanj Kurds of the Sioukanlu tribe who migrated to this region from eastern Turkey. Bajgiran is located in northwestern Khorasan, and the Kurmanj Kurds were relocated to northwestern Khorasan during the early Safavid dynasty to prevent invasions by Turkmenistan and Uzbekistan. The common languages in the city are mostly Kurdish Kormanji and Turkish and Persian are a minority. The religion of all is The Shiites of  Twelve Imams.

See also 

 List of cities, towns and villages in Razavi Khorasan Province

References 

Populated places in Quchan County
Cities in Razavi Khorasan Province